Kippax is a civil parish in the metropolitan borough of the City of Leeds, West Yorkshire, England.  The parish contains nine listed buildings that are recorded in the National Heritage List for England.  Of these, one is listed at Grade I, the highest of the three grades, and the others are at Grade II, the lowest grade.  The parish contains the village of Kippax and the surrounding countryside.  The listed buildings consist of houses and associated structures, a church and items in the churchyard, a barn, a former public house, a former windmill, and a milepost.


Key

Buildings

References

Citations

Sources

 

Lists of listed buildings in West Yorkshire